Arturo Joaquín Pellerano Alfau (1864–1935) was a Dominican merchant, publisher, and journalist. He, along with Julian Atiles, founded Listín Diario, the leading newspaper of the Dominican Republic, in 1889.  Pellerano tried to maintain the independence of his newspaper through many troubled times. During the US military intervention of 1916-24, he maintained a nationalistic line of constant protest. During Rafael Trujillo's reign, his newspaper office was attacked and he and his family were detained due to his decidedly Anti-Trujillo political views.

He married twice and had a total of 14 children. His family remained connected with the Diario until Banco Intercontinental bought it in 2003.

References

19th-century newspaper publishers (people)
1864 births
1935 deaths
20th-century Dominican Republic businesspeople
Dominican Republic journalists
Male journalists
Dominican Republic people of Italian descent
People of Ligurian descent
White Dominicans